This is a list of prominent people  who were born or lived in Jamshedpur.

Politicians 

 Raghubar Das, ex-Chief Minister of Jharkhand; born in Jamshedpur
 Rameesh Kailasam, Indian governance reform expert, born in Jamshedpur
 Arvind Kejriwal, Aam Aadmi Party leader; worked with Tata Steel; lived in Jamshedpur for two years
 Arjun Munda, politician, former Member of Parliament, and Chief Minister of Jharkhand

 Thakur Ji Pathak, Activist, politician

Business leaders 

 Ratan Tata, Chairman, Tata Group

Scholars and scientists 

 Gerald Durrell (1925–1995), naturalist, zookeeper, conservationist, author, and television presenter
 Rajit Gadh, Professor of Mechanical and Aerospace Engineering, University of California, Los Angeles
 Arshadul Qaudri, Muslim leader, social worker and writer

Activists 

 Digamber Hansda

Sportspersons 

 Varun Aaron, Indian bowler and part of current team India squad.
 Anthresh Lalit Lakra, boxer
 Purnima Mahato, coach of Indian archery team at the 2012 London Olympics
 Aruna Mishra, boxer
 Gourav Mukhi, footballer
 Diwakar Prasad, boxer
 Birju Shah, boxer
 Selay Soy, boxer
 Saurabh Tiwary, Cricketer

Artists and authors 

 Jahar Dasgupta, artist, painter, President of the Academy of Fine Arts, Kolkata

Actors and actresses 

 Imtiaz Ali, director; works include Socha Na Tha, Jab We Met, and Love Aaj Kal; writer of Indian cinema; born in Jamshedpur
 Pratyusha Banerjee, Indian television actress
 Amit Bose, filmmaker, director, editor
 Priyanka Chopra, Miss India World 2000; Miss World 2000 and Bollywood actress; born in Jamshedpur
 Astad Deboo, Padma Shree awardee; Indian contemporary dancer and choreographer and exponent of modern dance in India
 Rasika Dugal, actor
 Ishita Dutta, actress, born and raised in Jamshedpur
 Tanushree Dutta, Miss India Universe 2004 and Bollywood actress; born and raised in Jamshedpur
Auritra Ghosh
 Adarsh Gourav, actor
 Sanjeev Jaiswal, Bollywood Actor.
 Neeraj Kabi, Film and Theatre Actor.
 Sanjivan Lal, film director
 R. Madhavan, Indian Bollywood and Tamil cine star; born and brought up in Jamshedpur
 Shomu Mukherjee, director, writer, producer
 Shweta Basu Prasad, actress, born and raised in Jamshedpur
 Shilpa Rao, playback singer for Hindi films such as Aamir, Bachna Ae Haseeno, and Dev D
 Simone Singh, Bollywood actress; born and raised in Jamshedpur
 Vikram Singh, actor
Pooja Singh, television actress

References

 
Jamshedpur
Jamshedpur
Jharkhand